Helenus of Tarsus was a bishop of Tarsus and a metropolitan in the 3rd century.

References
 Sir William Smith, Henry Wace, A Dictionary of Christian Biography, Literature, Sects and Doctrines: Being a Continuation of "The Dictionary of the Bible, 2:886 full text

Saints from Roman Anatolia
3rd-century bishops in Roman Anatolia
Year of birth unknown